Soma Bay is a coastal resort on the Red Sea in Egypt,  south of Hurghada International Airport and about  north of Safaga port. The , self-contained community of Soma Bay is located on a peninsula surrounded on all sides by the sea.

Leisure activities at Soma Bay include Red Sea diving at its reef and other nearby diving sites. The five resorts (Kempinski, Sheraton, Robinson Club, The Cascades and The Breakers Diving & Surfing Lodge) also have access to an 18-hole, par 72 championship golf course and golf academy designed by Gary Player. Soma Bay also has one of the largest spas and thalassotherapy centers in the region. Water sports are popular due to the prevailing winds which allow for windsurfing, kitesurfing and sailing.

Soma Bay also has several residential compounds as it has become increasingly popular with Egyptian and foreign tourists. It is prominently divided into a number of areas including Soma Breeze, Mesca, Reef Town, Wadi Jebal, Bay West, and Bay Central.

See also
 Red Sea Riviera

References

External links 

 

Populated coastal places in Egypt
Populated places in Red Sea Governorate
Red Sea Riviera
Seaside resorts in Egypt
Underwater diving sites in Egypt
Peninsulas of Egypt